Kulathoor Phanamugham Devi Temple is an ancient temple which is located in the Trivandrum District, in south India.

Overview

Kulathoor Phanamugham Devi Temple is one of the ancient temples in south India. It is a famous temple situated in Trivandrum District, Kerala, India in Kulathoor village, Neyyattinkara Taluk. Thookkam is an important part of festival in this temple. The festival is conducted on month of February–March (kumbham). On the days of festival, devotees from different parts of kerala come here and take part. People believe that those who come here and prays will get blessings from devi and will get solutions to all our problems.

Hindu temples in Thiruvananthapuram district
Devi temples in Kerala